Alejandro Cortes (born 14 July 1955) is a former professional tennis player from Colombia.

Career
Cortes, who was born in Los Angeles, represented the Colombian team in Davis Cup tennis. He appeared in six ties and won eight of his 15 rubbers, six in singles and two in doubles.

The Colombian was a quarter-finalist at his home event at Bogotá in 1979 and also reached the doubles semi-finals of the Quito Open that year, with José López-Maeso.

In 1981, Cortes won the only Grand Slam matches of his career. At the French Open he and doubles partner Ricardo Acuña defeated Argentina's Gattiker brothers, Alejandro and Carlos, in the opening round. He also had a win in the first round of singles draw the US Open, over Jimmy Brown. The right-hander was also a quarter-finalist at Viña del Mar in 1981, as well as a doubles semi-finalist in Santiago.

He made the quarter-finals at Båstad in 1982.

References

External links
 
 
 

1955 births
Living people
Colombian male tennis players
Tennis players from Los Angeles
20th-century Colombian people
21st-century Colombian people